The Supercopa de España de Baloncesto 2016 was the 13th edition of the tournament since it is organized by the ACB and the 17th overall. It was also called Supercopa Endesa for sponsorship reasons. It was played in the Fernando Buesa Arena in Vitoria-Gasteiz on September 23 and 24.

Herbalife Gran Canaria won its first national title after beating Baskonia in the semifinal and FC Barcelona Lassa in the final.

Participant teams and draw
On August 1, 2016, the ACB confirmed Vitoria-Gasteiz to host the tournament and the participants. The draw of the semifinals will take part on 5 September 2016. As there will be only one seeded team (Real Madrid as League and Cup champion), there will not exist any restrictions for the pairings.

Semifinals

Baskonia vs. Herbalife Gran Canaria

Real Madrid vs. FC Barcelona Lassa

Final

References

External links
 Liga ACB website

Supercopa de España de Baloncesto
2016–17 in Spanish basketball cups